Chigozie Agbim is a Nigerian goalkeeper who plays for Delta Force F.C. in the Nigerian Premier League.

After a protracted transfer dispute, he joined Enugu Rangers from Warri Wolves F.C. in April 2013 for a fee of eight million naira (approx €39,300).

He joined Gombe United in February 2014  and rejoined Rangers in April 2015.

International career
Agbim made his international debut for Nigeria in a friendly against Angola in January 2012.

He was selected for Nigeria's squad at the 2013 Africa Cup of Nations and the 2013 FIFA Confederations Cup.

In January 2014, he was starting goalkeeper for the Super Eagles at the African Nations Championship, as the team finished in third place. In June, Agbim was named in Nigeria's squad for the 2014 FIFA World Cup.

References

External links 

1984 births
Nigeria international footballers
Living people
Gombe United F.C. players
Warri Wolves F.C. players
Delta Force F.C. players
Nigerian footballers
Rangers International F.C. players
2013 Africa Cup of Nations players
2013 FIFA Confederations Cup players
2014 FIFA World Cup players
Africa Cup of Nations-winning players
Al-Merrikh SC players
Sportspeople from Kaduna
Association football goalkeepers
Nigeria A' international footballers
2014 African Nations Championship players
Nigerian expatriate sportspeople in Sudan
Nigerian expatriate footballers
Expatriate footballers in Sudan